Dobrynia may refer to

 Dobrynya, Vladimir the Great's maternal uncle
 Dobrynia, Poland, village in Gmina Dębowiec, Jasło County, Subcarpathian Voivodeship